Sultan Kalanjar, better known as Gharib Shah, was an Iranian aristocrat who rebelled against Safavid rule in 1629/30, but was defeated and later executed.

Biography 

A native of Gilan, Gharib Shah was a descendant of the Kia'i dynasty, and his original name was Sultan Kalanjar, but when he in 1629/30 rebelled against Safavid rule in his home-province, he took the name of Adil Shah, while he was called Gharib Shah by his enemies. Before Gharib Shah rebelled, he had received the blessing of a certain Pir Shams-i Gulgiluva'i. 

During his rebellion, he was joined by various descendants of dynasties of Mazandaran and Gilan. After having declared himself as the ruler of Gilan, he occupied the provinces two major cities, Lahijan and Rasht. When Gharib's rebellion spread to Mazandaran, the rebels sacked Shah Abbas' warehouses, selling off the royal silk. Two hundred kharvari were lost or stolen. 

According to the Tarikh-i Gilan, by Abd al-Fattah Fumani, Gilan's inhabitants lost over 300,000 tumans, due to this rebellion. Consequently, Gharib Shah was eventually defeated by a group of Safavid governors, which included Saru Taqi, the governor of Gilan and Mazandaran. Gharib Shah, along with 2,000 of his supporters, were then executed at Isfahan. However, a supporter of Gharib Shah who claimed that he was his brother, rebelled in Mazandaran.

References

Sources 

 
 
 
 
 

Rebellions against Safavid Iran
17th-century Iranian people
Year of birth unknown
1629 deaths
People from Gilan Province
People executed by Safavid Iran
Gilaki people